The 1991 Toronto bomb plot refers to an Islamist terror plot that sought to attack two Toronto buildings - the India Centre cinema and the Vishnu Hindu temple, it was the first 'homegrown' Islamic terrorist plot on Toronto.

Eventually, Canadian authorities arrested five men of Trinidadian and Dominican ethnicity, and accused them of ties to Jamaat ul-Fuqra alongside the bomb plot. All five were acquitted of the main charge of conspiring to commit murder.

Arrests
Four of the men tried to cross the Rainbow Bridge into the United States in October 1991. Customs officials searched their Buick and Chevrolet Suburban and found "detailed plans to bomb a York Region Hindu temple and an Indian theater in Toronto", including aerial photographs and blueprints of the Vishnu Mandir Temple and India Centre cinema, as well as references to a "hit team," a "guard team" and "recon team", and amateur videotapes of the men, and the interiors of the buildings.

Each of the men were charged with conspiracy to commit mischief and conspiracy to commit murder.

Trial
Eight men were accused in total. One was dismissed. Fongenie escaped to Pakistan. A Brooklyn man pleaded guilty to weapons offences. Ford, the three Texans and another Toronto man, Khidr Ali, were sent to trial.
The trial was moved to St. Catharines from Toronto, and began in October 1993 The Metro Toronto Police, in a move later attributed to the fact they "still really didn't know what to do with their intelligence unit", assigned their security intelligence officers to take up heavy arms and guard the courthouse.

Assistant Crown Attorney Philip Enright described documents found in the defendants' cars that suggested entering a building through a men's washroom window, and possibly having a female operative planting a bomb in the women's washroom.

It was revealed that the Chevrolet searched at the border belonged to American Mustafa Abdu Rashid, and that the men had phoned him thirty times from the car phone in the vehicle. A search of Rashid's apartment revealed nine semi-automatic firearms.

The three Americans were deported from Canada after their sentences were completed in April 2006, and Harris was added to the TSA's no-fly list, as was Wesley and his aliases Robert Fitz Clarence, Bobby Johnson and Wali Muhammad.

References

Failed terrorist attempts in Canada
1991 in Toronto
Terrorist incidents in North America in 1991
Terrorist incidents in Canada in the 1990s
Islamic terrorism in Canada
1991 crimes in Canada
Anti-Hindu violence
Hinduism in Canada